The Bangladesh National Film Award for Best Performance in a Negative Role (Bengali: বাংলাদেশ জাতীয় চলচ্চিত্র পুরস্কার শ্রেষ্ঠ খলচরিত্রে অভিনেতা) is one of the highest film awards in Bangladesh.

List of winners
Key

See also
 Bangladesh National Film Award for Best Performance in a Negative Role
 Bangladesh National Film Award for Best Actor
 Bangladesh National Film Award for Best Actress
 Bangladesh National Film Award for Best Supporting Actor
 Bangladesh National Film Award for Best Supporting Actress

Notes

References

Sources

 
 
 
 
 
 

Comic
 
Film awards for Best Cast